Lomi's blind legless skink (Typhlosaurus lomiae) is a species of lizard in the family Scincidae. The species is endemic to Little Namaqualand in South Africa.

Etymology
The specific name lomiae honours Miss Lomi Wessels Brown, Collection Manager of lower vertebrates and invertebrates at the Transvaal Museum since 1976.

Taxonomy
In 1986 South African herpetologist Wulf Dietrich Haacke originally named this species Typhlosaurus lomii, which is masculine (genitive singular). In 2004 J. Pieter Michels and Aaron Matthew Bauer corrected the specific name to lomiae, which is feminine (genitive singular) because it honors a woman.

Description
T. lomiae is limbless. It is blind, slender, and small. Dorsally, it is bright goldish pink. Ventrally, it is whitish and almost translucent.

Habitat
The preferred habitat of T. lomiae is succulent veld with sandy soil.

Reproduction
T. lomiae is viviparous.

References

Further reading
Haacke WD (1986). "Description of a new species of Typhlosaurus Wiegmann, 1834 (Reptilia: Scincidae) from the west coast of southern Africa, with new records of related species". Annals of the Transvaal Museum 34 (9): 227–235. (Typhlosaurus lomii, new species).

Typhlosaurus
Skinks of Africa
Endemic reptiles of South Africa
Reptiles described in 1986
Taxonomy articles created by Polbot